CHBD-FM (92.7 MHz) is a radio station in Regina, Saskatchewan. Owned by Bell Media, it broadcasts a country format branded as Pure Country 92.7. Its studios are located at 4303 Albert Street in south Regina.

History 

In May 2007, the CRTC awarded licenses for new radio stations in Regina to Standard Broadcasting (which, the previous month, had agreed to be sold to Astral Media), and Aboriginal Voices Radio. Standard proposed a "new country" station on 92.7 FM.

The station officially launched as Big Dog 92.7 on February 20, 2008, under the ownership of Astral Media. Launch promotions for the new station included a 5,000-song commercial-free marathon, a station-sponsored concert featuring Aaron Pritchett at the local Pump Roadhouse nightclub, and an on-air contest surrounding the Alan Jackson song "Gone Country" (the first song played by the station). It was the first local competitor to the AM country station CKRM (which carries a full service country format with additional agriculture and sports-related programs).

Astral Media was in turn acquired by Bell Media in 2013, making CHBD-FM a sister station to CTV television station CKCK-DT.

On May 28, 2019, the station was renamed Pure Country 92.7 as part of a nationwide rebranding of all Bell Media country stations.

References

External links
 
 
 

HBD
HBD
HBD
Radio stations established in 2008
2008 establishments in Saskatchewan